Mark Turpin is an American poet.

Life
He is the son of a Presbyterian minister.  He has spent 25 years working construction and building houses.
He graduated from Boston University at age 47, with a master's degree.

He lives and works in Berkeley, California.

His work has appeared in The Paris Review, The Threepenny Review, Ploughshares, and Slate.

Awards
1997 Whiting Award
2004 Ploughshares John C. Zacharis First Book Award for Hammer

Works
"Jobsite Wind", Slate
"Waiting for Lumber", Slate, July 16, 2002
"The Furrow", Tarpaulin Sky, Winter 2002
"The Box"; "Pickwork"; "Shithouse"; "In Winter"; "Will Turpin b. 1987"; "Photograph From Antietam", Boston Review, 19.1
"The Box", Online News Hour, September 2, 2002

Ploughshares

References

External links
Profile at The Whiting Foundation

Year of birth missing (living people)
Living people
American male poets
Boston University alumni